Mark Burdett Motorsport is a motor racing team, that races in Formula Renault and Formula BMW. The team was established in 1994 by Mark Burdett, who is still the team manager.

Past drivers in the team have included Markus Niemelä and Stian Sørlie in 2006.
Latterly Raoul Owens in 2013 and 2014.

External links 

British auto racing teams
British Formula Renault teams
Formula Renault Eurocup teams

Formula BMW teams
Auto racing teams established in 1994